The 2012 Israeli Final Four was the 7th Israeli Final Four tournament and the concluding tournament of the 2011–12 Israeli Basketball Super League. The event was held at Yad Eliyahu Arena, Tel Aviv, Israel on 22 and 24 May 2012 to determine the winner of the 2011–12 Israeli League. The Participating teams are: Maccabi Tel Aviv, Hapoel Holon, Maccabi Ashdod and Maccabi Rishon LeZion.

Venue
The Yad Eliyahu Arena is an indoor sports arena in Tel Aviv, Israel. Opened in 1963 as an open-air venue with a capacity of 5,000, it was covered in 1972, and further renovations since then have brought its current capacity to 11,700. It had hosted the 1971–1972 FIBA European Champions Cup final, the 1993–94 FIBA European Championship Final Four, the 2003–2004 Euroleague Final Four, and all previous Israeli Final Fours.

Results

Bracket

Semifinals

Semifinal 1

Semifinal 2

Third-place playoff

Final

References

IBA's official website (Hebrew)

1